Myachkovo  is an airport in Moscow Oblast, Russia, located  southeast of Moscow.  The runway length including overrun is 1650 m.  The facility services transport aircraft up to the size of Ilyushin Il-76 cargo jets. It is owned by Finpromko company.

It is the largest of 19 airports for small planes, helicopters and private flights in Moscow Oblast.

Accidents and incidents
On 26 June 2004, Lisunov Li-2T RA-1300K of FLA RF crashed at Zaozerye shortly after take-off and was destroyed. The aircraft was operating a domestic non-scheduled passenger flight to Grabtsevo Airport, Kaluga. Two of the five people on board were killed.

See also 
 Autodrom Moscow

References

External links

Myachkovo Airport official website

Airports built in the Soviet Union
Airports in Moscow Oblast